The  is a private railroad company in Japan, and a subsidiary of the Tokyu Corporation. The company operates the Izu Kyūkō Line train service on Izu Peninsula in Shizuoka Prefecture, and has subsidiary operations involved in taxi and bus services, as well as real estate and leisure resort development and a cable television network.

Company history
The Tokyu Corporation began preliminary work on a train line connecting Itō Station, the terminus of the Japanese National Railways' Itō Line, with Shimoda, at the southern tip of the Izu Peninsula in 1956. On February 20, 1961, the company changed its name to its current name of Izukyū Corporation. Actual train operation began at Itō Station on December 10, 1961, and a centralized traffic control center established at Itō in 1982.

Izukyū Corporation was listed in the Second Section of the Tokyo Stock Exchange from November 1, 1972. However, it was delisted on October 1, 2004 and returned to the status of a fully owned subsidiary of the Tokyu Corporation.

Lines
At present, the company operates one train line, the Izu Kyūkō Line, with a total length of 45.7 kilometers.

The Shimoda Ropeway is a subsidiary of the Izukyū Corporation.

Rolling stock

Active 

 2100 series (introduced 1985)
 8000 series (former Tokyu 8000 series transferred to Izukyu in 2004)
 3000 series (former JR East 209-2100 series, introduced 2022)

References

Sakanishi, Satoru (2001). Management Strategy of Tokyu, Keita Gotō (in Japanese). Bungeisha. .

External links
 Official website 

 
Tokyu Group
Railway companies of Japan
Companies based in Shizuoka Prefecture
Railway companies established in 1959